Dömitz is a municipality in the Ludwigslust-Parchim district, in Mecklenburg-Western Pomerania, Germany. It is situated on the right bank of the Elbe, 25 km southwest of Ludwigslust, and 37 km northwest of Wittenberge.

It was granted town rights by the counts of Dannenberg in the 13th century. In the 16th century, the Dömitz Fortress was built.

Notable people
 (1490–1532), chaplain and Protestant Reformers
 (1867–1941), marine officer and counter admiral

References

Cities and towns in Mecklenburg
Ludwigslust-Parchim
Populated places established in the 13th century
1259 establishments in Europe
1250s establishments in Germany
Grand Duchy of Mecklenburg-Schwerin
Populated riverside places in Germany
Populated places on the Elbe